Krei is a village in Kose Parish, Harju County in northern Estonia. It is located between Kose and the Tallinn–Tartu road (E263), Kose-Uuemõisa is situated northwest. The village's territory is passed through by the Pirita River. As of 2011 Census, the settlement's population was 138.

An ecovillage for 44 families is planned into Krei village. It is predicted that the engineering will start in 2013 and the construction of houses in 2014.

References

Villages in Harju County